ABC Fine Wine & Spirits is a privately held American alcohol retailer founded by Jack Holloway in 1936. ABC Fine Wine & Spirits is a Florida-based independent retailer of wine and spirits. The company's headquarters are in Orlando, Florida, and they have nearly 150 stores located in the state.

Products
Some ABC Fine Wine & Spirits locations have more than 500 beers, 5,000 wines, 2,000 spirits, and 400 cigars, in addition to gourmet foods, glassware, and other related items.

References

External links
 Official website

Wine retailers
Companies based in Orlando, Florida
Retail companies established in 1936
1936 establishments in Florida
Retail companies of the United States
Drink companies of the United States